The trombonium is a brass instrument formerly manufactured by H.N. White Company and Conn-Selmer. It was unveiled by H.N. White in 1938 and was manufactured until the mid 1970s. The trombonium has the same timbre as a regular trombone except in a smaller, more compact form. It was originally designed to be used as a marching trombone, and has valves rather than a slide thus superficially resembles a tenor horn or euphonium. It was used by the University of Southern California Marching Band and on a handful of jazz recordings (e.g., Jay and Kai + 6).

References

Trombones